Brighouse is a town in West Yorkshire, England. It may also refer to:

Associated with the English town
 Brighouse High School
 Brighouse railway station
 Brighouse Town FC

People
 Harold Brighouse (1882-1958), English playwright and author
 Harry Brighouse, British political philosopher at the University of Wisconsin-Madison
 James Brighouse, 19th-century American leader of a splinter sect of the Latter Day Saint movement
 Tim Brighouse (born 1940), British educator and former Schools Commissioner for London

Other uses
 Brighouse, Richmond, Canada, a neighbourhood
 Richmond–Brighouse station, a rapid transit station in Richmond, British Columbia, Canada
 Samuel Brighouse Elementary, a school in Richmond, British Columbia, Canada

See also
 Brighouse and Spenborough (UK Parliament constituency), a former British parliamentary constituency